Lindale Mall is an enclosed regional shopping mall on the northeast side of Cedar Rapids, Iowa, United States.

Lindale is anchored by Von Maur. Outparcel properties include a free-standing Hy-Vee supermarket (closed January 2022) and Jo-Ann (occupying a former movie theater), as well as several restaurants, including The Boulder Tap House, Arby's, Five Guys Burgers,  Cheddars, Panda Express, Red Lobster, and Chick-Fil-A.

History
On February 15, 1956, Sears and Younkers announced plans for a new open-air shopping center in northeast Cedar Rapids. These plans were opposed by downtown Cedar Rapids merchants, who formed an organization to oppose the rezoning of the land from residential to commercial use. The Cedar Rapids City Council eventually approved the rezoning, and Lindale Plaza opened on September 15, 1960. Sears, Younkers, and Killian's (a local department store) were Lindale's original anchors, with Sears relocating from downtown Cedar Rapids. Other early tenants included Kresge's, an Eagle supermarket, and Bishop's Buffet (which closed in September 2003). Sears and Younkers are the only two tenants who have continuously operated at Lindale since its opening.

Lindale Plaza became the enclosed Lindale Mall in 1980, shortly after Westdale Mall opened in southwest Cedar Rapids. The only anchor change in Lindale's history came in 1981, when Petersen Harned Von Maur replaced Killian's as the latter went bankrupt (its last store in downtown Cedar Rapids closed in November 1982). In August 1997, Lindale completed a $15 million expansion and renovation project that included construction of a new 500-stall parking ramp and a new 500-seat food court.

Lindale Plaza was built by Bernard Greenbaum and Associates, who also built Merle Hay Mall in Des Moines. Greenbaum later sold Lindale to General Growth Properties, who opened the Town & Country Shopping Center 1½ miles to the south in 1956. (Town & Country was Cedar Rapids' first strip mall and General Growth's first shopping center.) General Growth sold Lindale to the Equitable Life Assurance Society of the United States in 1984 as part of its real estate investment trust liquidation but continued to manage the mall until March 1998, when SDG Macerich — a partnership of the Simon Property Group and The Macerich Company — purchased Lindale Mall. In May 2014, Simon spun off the property into a separate company, Washington Prime Group, later becoming WP Glimcher in early 2015. Washington Prime Group currently owns and manages the mall.

In 2015, Sears Holdings spun off 235 of its properties, including the Sears at Lindale Mall, into Seritage Growth Properties.

On April 12, 2018, Sears announced that will close the Lindale Mall location in July. In addition, On April 18, 2018 it was announced that Younkers will close, as the parent, Bon-Ton Stores, is going out of business. The store closed on August 31 2018. Both closures left Von Maur as the only remaining anchor. Part of the former Sears is expected to become Planet Fitness. In 2021, Washington Prime Group, the owners of the mall, filed for Chapter 11 bankruptcy.

References

External links
 Lindale Mall's website

Shopping malls in Iowa
Washington Prime Group
Tourist attractions in Cedar Rapids, Iowa
Buildings and structures in Cedar Rapids, Iowa
Shopping malls established in 1960